Steve Lynch (born June 1, 1954) is an American politician who served as a member of the Missouri House of Representatives for the 122nd district from 2012 to 2021.. He is a member of the Republican party.

References

Living people
Republican Party members of the Missouri House of Representatives
1954 births
21st-century American politicians
People from Waynesville, Missouri